The Diving competition in the 1963 Summer Universiade in Porto Alegre, Brazil.

Medal overview

Medal table

References

 

1963 in water sports
1963 Summer Universiade
1963
1963 in diving